Betty Jane Baker (née Phillips; May 6, 1927 – April 2, 2002) was a singer, songwriter and vocal contractor, who worked as a backup singer on recordings by Elvis Presley, Frank Sinatra, Bobby Darin, The Righteous Brothers and Sam Cooke, among others.  She also sang on the radio, with big bands and did voice work for television and films and appeared on television variety shows.

Early life and career
Born in Birmingham, Alabama, Baker was Miss Alabama in 1944 as Betty Jane Rase, and was 4th runner-up in the 1944 Miss America Pageant.

From the 1940s, Baker sang in big bands and on the radio, and in the 1960s, she appeared in several television shows, including the variety shows of Dean Martin and Judy Garland.  She backed Elvis Presley in his recording of "Can't Help Falling in Love", Lloyd Price in "Stagger Lee", Sam Cooke in "You Send Me", Bobby Darin in "Dream Lover", Frank Sinatra in "That's Life", Jackie Wilson in "Baby Workout", The Righteous Brothers in "You've Lost That Lovin' Feelin'" and Nancy Sinatra on her 1969 album Nancy.  She also was well regarded as a vocal contractor for backup singers and recorded extensively with the Anita Kerr Singers.

In addition to her studio singing, Baker was the singing voice of Linda Low (played by Nancy Kwan) in the 1961 film version of Flower Drum Song and also lent her voice to The Story of Babar, the Little Elephant (1968 TV movie), Babar Comes to America (1971 TV movie) and Heidi's Song (1982).

Personal life
Baker was first married to Mickey Rooney (1920–2014) from 1944 to 1949; the couple had two children, Mickey Rooney Jr. (1945–2022) and Tim Rooney (1947–2006). She was later married to composer Buddy Baker from 1950 to 1957, and jazz guitarist Barney Kessel from 1961 until their divorce in 1980.

Death
She died on April 2, 2002, at the age of 74, in Rancho Mirage, California, from complications following a stroke.

References

Further reading
Bennett, James R. Historic Birmingham & Jefferson County: An Illustrated History, Historical Publishing Network, 2008
 Marx, Arthur. The Nine Lives of Mickey Rooney (New York: Berkley Publishing Group, 1988 reprint)
 Rooney, Mickey. Life Is Too Short (New York: Random House, 1991)
 Summerfield, Maurice J. and Barney Kessel. Barney Kessel Jazz Legend (Ashley Mark Publishing, 2008 paperback)

External links
Baker's IMDb profile
 
 
Early photo of Baker
Photo of Baker with Rooney
Photo of Baker in 1948
Extensive list of Baker's credits at Allmusic
Baker at Artist Direct
Baker at AlbumCredits.com

1927 births
2002 deaths
Miss Alabama winners
Miss America 1940s delegates
Miss America Preliminary Talent winners
Miss America Preliminary Swimsuit winners
Musicians from Birmingham, Alabama
20th-century American singers
20th-century American women singers